Hidden Hand: Exposing How the Chinese Communist Party Is Reshaping the World is a 2020 book by Australians Clive Hamilton and Mareike Ohlberg, and is a follow up of Hamilton's 2018 book Silent Invasion. The book details the claim of "the Chinese Communist Party’s global program of influence and subversion, and the threat it poses to democracy".

The book details what the authors describe as "the nature and extent of the Chinese Communist Party’s influence operations across the Western world – in politics, business, universities, think tanks and international institutions such as the UN. This new authoritarian power is using democracy to undermine democracy in pursuit of its global ambitions".

Andrew Podger wrote in his book review in The Conversation that while it was extremely detailed, it was not a balanced and scholarly document. He said that while Hamilton and Ohlberg wanted to respond to Chinese influence by rejecting liberal economics and strengthening democratic politics, what was needed was actually a combination of both.

The Japanese translation was published by Asuka Shinsha Publishing as Invisible Hand: How Is the Chinese Communist Party Reshaping the World? (見えない手 中国共産党は世界をどう作り変えるか) on December 25, 2020.

Libel lawsuit 
In June 2020, the 48 Group Club and its chairman Stephen Perry launched a libel lawsuit in a failed attempt to block the publication of the book in Canada, the United Kingdom, and the United States.

References

External links 

 

2020 non-fiction books
Books by Clive Hamilton
Books about international relations
Anti-Chinese sentiment in Australia
Anti-communism in Australia
Australian non-fiction books
Australia–China relations
Collaborative non-fiction books